The Liverpool and Manchester Railway (L&M) opened on 15 September 1830. Although horse-drawn railways already existed elsewhere, the Stockton and Darlington Railway had been running for five years, and a few industrial sites already used primitive steam locomotives for bulk haulage, the L&M was the first locomotive-hauled railway to connect two major cities, and the first to provide a scheduled passenger service. The opening day was a major public event. Arthur Wellesley, Duke of Wellington, the prime minister, rode on one of the eight inaugural trains, as did many other dignitaries and notable figures of the day. Huge crowds lined the track at Liverpool to watch the trains depart for Manchester.

The trains left Liverpool on time and without any technical problems. The Duke of Wellington's special train ran on one track, and the other seven trains ran on an adjacent and parallel track, sometimes ahead and sometimes behind the duke's train. Around  out of Liverpool the first of many problems occurred, when one of the trains derailed and the following train collided with it. With no reported injuries or damage, the derailed locomotive was lifted back onto the track and the journey continued. At Parkside railway station, near the midpoint of the line, the locomotives made a scheduled stop to take on water. Although the railway staff advised passengers to remain on the trains while this took place, around 50 of the dignitaries on board alighted when the Duke of Wellington's special train stopped. One of those who got off was William Huskisson, former cabinet minister and Member of Parliament for Liverpool. Huskisson had been a highly influential figure in the creation of the British Empire and an architect of the doctrine of free trade, but had fallen out with Wellington in 1828 over the issue of parliamentary reform and had resigned from the cabinet. Hoping to be reconciled with Wellington, he approached the duke's railway carriage and shook his hand. Distracted by the duke, he did not notice an approaching locomotive on the adjacent track, Rocket. On realising it was approaching, he panicked and tried to clamber into the duke's carriage, but the door of the carriage swung open, leaving him hanging directly in the path of the oncoming Rocket. He fell onto the tracks in front of the train, suffering serious leg injuries, and dying later that night.

The Duke of Wellington felt that the remainder of the day's events should be cancelled following the accident at Parkside, and proposed to return to Liverpool. However, a large crowd had gathered in Manchester to see the trains arrive, and was beginning to become unruly. Wellington was persuaded to continue to Manchester. By the time the trains reached the outskirts of Manchester the crowd had become hostile and was spilling onto the tracks. With local authorities unable to clear the tracks, the trains were obliged to drive at low speed into the crowd, using their own momentum to push people out of the way. Eventually they arrived at Liverpool Road railway station in Manchester to be met by a hostile crowd, who waved banners and flags against the duke and pelted him with vegetables. Wellington refused to get off the train, and ordered that the trains return to Liverpool. Mechanical failures and an inability to turn the locomotives meant that most of the trains were unable to leave Manchester. While the Duke of Wellington's train left successfully, only three of the remaining seven locomotives were usable. These three locomotives slowly hauled a single long train of 24 carriages back to Liverpool, eventually arriving six and a half hours late after having been pelted with objects thrown from bridges by the drunken crowds lining the track.

The death and funeral of William Huskisson caused the opening of the railway to be widely reported, and people around the world became aware that cheap and rapid long-distance land transport was now possible for the first time. The L&M became extremely successful, and within a month of its opening plans were put forward to connect Liverpool and Manchester with the other major cities of England. The L&M remains in operation, and its opening is now considered the start of the age of mechanised transport; in the words of industrialist and former British Rail chairman Peter Parker, "the world is a branch line of the pioneering Liverpool–Manchester run".

Background

Liverpool and Manchester Railway 

The Liverpool and Manchester Railway (L&M) was founded on 24 May 1823 by Liverpool merchants Joseph Sandars and Henry Booth, with the aim of linking the textile mills of Manchester to the nearest deep water port at the Port of Liverpool. Although horse and human powered railways had existed for centuries, and steam power was beginning to be used in some experimental industrial railways, the L&M was to be the first steam powered railway to provide an inter-city passenger service, and the most expensive engineering project yet undertaken in Britain. (Because much of the Liverpool and Manchester Railway ran over land owned by investors in the company, and because many of the early locomotives were owned by the engineering firms which built them rather than by the L&M, it is impossible to give a precise figure for the L&M's construction costs. The direct construction cost of the line up to its opening was around £820,000, and the two years of lobbying necessary to get the railway authorised is estimated to have cost £70,000. In comparison, the Bridgewater Canal, which had the same purpose as the L&M in connecting Manchester to the Port of Liverpool, had cost an estimated £220,000 to build in the late 18th century. The average labourer's wage in the area at this time was around £20 per year.)

The Marquess of Stafford, owner of the Bridgewater Canal, was a friend of Liverpool's Member of Parliament William Huskisson, with whom he had worked at the British Embassy in Paris. Although the Marquess had initially feared the potential impact of railways on the income from his canal and had been strongly opposed to the railway, Huskisson persuaded him to allow the railway to use his lands and to invest in the scheme.

In 1826 George Stephenson was appointed to design and build the  route. Stephenson built the line using four equally spaced rails; he envisaged that this would allow the line to operate as a double tracked railway line under normal circumstances, but that in the event of a locomotive needing to haul a particularly wide load or of one of the outside rails breaking, a train could run along the central pair of rails. He also felt that, by having the rails this close together, it would reduce the amount of land required for the already extremely expensive L&M scheme.

William Huskisson 

William Huskisson was born at Birtsmorton Court, Malvern, Worcestershire, on 11 March 1770. In 1783, Huskisson went to Paris to live with his great-uncle Dr. Richard Gem, witnessing the early years of the French Revolution, and was present at the Storming of the Bastille. Learning economics from the Marquis de Condorcet, he became an assistant to Earl Gower, who would later become the Marquess of Stafford. In 1792 Britain severed diplomatic relations with the French revolutionary government and Huskisson returned to London.

On Huskisson's return to London Henry Dundas, the Home Secretary, appointed him to oversee the execution of the Aliens Act, which dealt with refugees arriving in Britain from areas affected by the French Revolution. He performed this task well, and in 1795 he was appointed Under-Secretary of State for War at the age of 24. In 1796 he was elected Member of Parliament (MP) for Morpeth. In 1799 he married Eliza Emily Milbanke (known as Emily), daughter of Admiral Mark Milbanke, and shortly afterwards moved to Eartham House near Chichester. He resigned from public office in 1801 following the fall of William Pitt the Younger's government. In 1804 he was re-elected to Parliament for Liskeard, and appointed to the post of Secretary to the Treasury by the returning Pitt. In 1809 Huskisson resigned from the government along with George Canning following Canning's duel with fellow cabinet minister Lord Castlereagh. In 1814 he re-entered public life as First Commissioner of Woods and Forests; although this was a relatively minor post, he was very influential in the development of detailed legislation and policy, particularly regarding the controversial relaxation of the Corn Laws.

In 1823 Huskisson was appointed to the Cabinet as President of the Board of Trade and Treasurer of the Navy. In the same year he succeeded George Canning in the important constituency of Liverpool. He oversaw a number of reforms aimed at developing industry and free trade, including reform of the Navigation Acts and reduction of taxes on manufacturing and on the import of foreign goods. He drove through the restructuring of Britain's network of overseas outposts and colonies into the network of economically and politically interdependent states which became the British Empire, aiming for a gradual abolition of slavery and accelerating British colonisation.

In April 1827 Huskisson's mentor George Canning became prime minister, but died less than four months later and was succeeded by Viscount Goderich. Goderich appointed Huskisson Secretary of State for War and the Colonies. Goderich resigned in January 1828 and was replaced as prime minister by Arthur Wellesley, Duke of Wellington. Huskisson, along with many other protégés of Canning, resigned later that year over the issue of the lack of parliamentary representation for Manchester. Huskisson remained in Parliament as MP for Liverpool, and devoted himself to working on behalf of the growing industrial towns of north west England; the Manchester Guardian described him as "perhaps the most useful practical statesman of the present day". Although still weak from a previous serious illness, he felt it was his duty as Liverpool's MP to attend the opening of the railway.

Rainhill Trials and preparation for opening 

In late 1829, with construction of the railway almost complete, the Rainhill trials were held on a short level stretch of the completed line near Rainhill, to test how the track withstood locomotives running over it and to determine which type of locomotive would be used, with a £500 prize at stake. The Trials were widely publicised, and 10,000–15,000 people attended the first day on 6 October 1829. Of the five entrants Rocket, built by George Stephenson and his son Robert, was the only entrant to complete the trial without suffering a serious failure, and was duly selected as the design to be used. (Although often described as a race, and shown as such in illustrations, the Rainhill Trials were a series of independent trials. Each engine ran on a different day.) At around the time of the Rainhill Trials the tunnel to the forthcoming Liverpool terminus—the first tunnel ever dug under a major built-up area—was completed. To win over sceptical locals it was whitewashed, fitted with lighting and a band, and the public charged a shilling apiece to walk through it.

By early 1830 the line was almost complete, and locomotives began trial runs over the route. Booth convened a meeting of the directors that evening, who decided that the railway would be ready to open in late summer. After consulting with the office of the Duke of Wellington over when he would be available to attend an inauguration ceremony, and learning that he was due in the area on 13 September to attend a dinner in Manchester, it was agreed that the railway would formally open on Wednesday 15 September 1830.

Actress, author and anti-slavery campaigner Fanny Kemble, who accompanied George Stephenson on a test of the L&M prior to its opening, described the tests in a letter written in early 1830:

Opening day 

The directors of the L&M set out to do all they could to make the opening day a success. It was decided that for the opening, the dignitaries and guests would assemble in Liverpool, and eight of the L&M's locomotives would haul them in special trains to Liverpool Road railway station, the railway's Manchester terminus. A number of covered railway carriages "resembling the most luxurious of road coaches", with cushioned seating and cloth linings and each capable of carrying between 12 and 24 passengers, were provided for the more important persons among those attending. More basic open carriages, described by an observer as "plain homely unadorned butter-and-egg sort of market carts", each carried 60 passengers. Cabinetmaker James Edmondson was commissioned to design a special carriage for the Duke of Wellington and his companions, described by Egerton Smith as: 

This special train was divided into four carriages. Behind the locomotive was a wagon carrying a band, and behind it were three passenger carriages, with the Duke's special carriage in the centre. It was drawn by Northumbrian, Stephenson's most advanced locomotive at the time with a  engine. The Duke's train was to run on the southern of the L&M's two tracks, and the other seven trains would run on the northern track, to ensure the Duke would not be delayed should any of the other trains encounter problems.

The gathering of the dignitaries at the station and the departure of the trains was a major event. Every hotel room and lodging-house in Liverpool was full the night before. From 9:00 am onwards the area around the station was filled with people, and crowds thronged the trackside at Liverpool to watch the trains depart. One group of men had each paid two shillings for access to the best vantage point, the top of a chimney near the tunnel leading to Crown Street railway station; they were hoisted up by rope and board shortly after dawn to watch proceedings.

Shortly before 10:00 am as the Duke of Wellington arrived, a band played See, the Conquering Hero Comes in his honour, beginning a tradition of the song being played at almost every British railway station opening from then on. The Duke's party entered their carriage; a gun was then fired to mark the opening of the railway. The Duke's carriages had their brakes released and were allowed to roll down the incline under the force of gravity to be coupled to the waiting Northumbrian.

Soldiers cleared the tracks of onlookers, and the procession of trains left Crown Street station in Liverpool at 11:00 am,  William and Emily Huskisson travelled in the Ducal train, in the passenger carriage immediately in front of the Duke's carriage. Northumbrian slowed periodically to allow the seven trains on the northern track to parade past it, but generally ran ahead of the other trains.

Phoenix collision 
Near Parr, about  out of Liverpool, the world's first passenger train-on-train collision took place, as described by "A Railer" in Blackwood's Edinburgh Magazine, who was travelling in the lead train on the northern track, hauled by Phoenix:
With no reported injuries from this incident, the wheels of the derailed Phoenix were remounted on the rails and the journey continued. After crossing the Sankey Viaduct, the trains passed Warrington Junction, where George Stephenson's Warrington and Newton Railway was under construction in the expectation of eventual extension southwards to link the L&M to Birmingham and London. After passing Warrington Junction, the parade of trains passed through the historic market town of Newton-le-Willows, roughly at the midpoint of the line.

Parkside 

Although in an isolated rural area, Parkside station had been designed as a junction station and water stop for proposed connections with the Wigan Branch Railway and the Bolton and Leigh Railway, and had multiple lines of rails in place. A leaflet given to those travelling on the trains advised that while: 

The Duke's train had run more slowly through populated areas owing to the cheering crowds, and by the time it reached Parkside the first two trains on the northern track, hauled by Phoenix and North Star, had already passed through Parkside and had pulled up ahead of the station waiting for the Duke's train to depart. By now, the passengers in the Duke's train had been travelling for almost an hour, and the water stop at Parkside was the only scheduled stop on the journey. Although it was beginning to drizzle, and despite a request from the railway engineers for passengers to remain on the trains, at 11:55 am around 50 men disembarked from the Duke's train to stretch their legs. The group consisted of many of the most influential figures of the day, including the Marquess of Stafford, Charles Arbuthnot, Prince Esterházy, the Earl of Wilton, L&M founder Joseph Sandars and William Huskisson. As the rain had formed deep puddles on either side of the railway embankment, most of the party remained on or near the railway tracks.

The group stood around the rail lines and discussed the events of the day and the potential of rail travel. According to Sandars, Huskisson congratulated him on the achievement of his vision, and said to Sandars that he "must be one of the happiest men in the world". William Holmes, the Chief Whip, then called Huskisson to one side. He suggested that, with the Duke of Wellington in a particularly good mood owing to the cheering crowds which had lined the route, it might be a good time for Huskisson and the Duke to meet and try to arrange a reconciliation.

The Duke of Wellington was becoming unpopular as prime minister, particularly in the industrial north west of England, for continually blocking proposed reforms. Huskisson saw himself as well placed to unite the two wings of the Tory party should the Duke retire, or to lead the reforming faction of the party into a split from the Tories and a progressive alliance with the Whigs. He also saw himself as a natural ally for the Duke, despite their political differences, as a Tory popular in Liverpool and Manchester, both of which were traditionally hostile to the party. Newspapers were already beginning to report rumours that Huskisson and his supporters were to be invited back into the government.

Huskisson saw the Duke of Wellington sitting in the front corner of his special carriage. Huskisson walked along the tracks to the carriage, extended a hand, and the Duke reached out of the carriage and shook it.

Rocket collision 

As Huskisson and the Duke of Wellington exchanged greetings, some of the crowd saw Rocket, hauling the third of the seven trains on the northern track, approaching in the distance. They shouted "An engine is approaching, take care gentlemen" to those people—including Huskisson—standing on the tracks.

The men gathered on the track moved out of the way of the approaching Rocket, either by climbing onto the embankment or getting back into their carriages. Unlike the other carriages, Edmondson had not equipped the Duke's carriage with fixed steps. Instead, a movable set of steps was at the back of the carriage, to be moved into position to allow travellers to board and alight at whichever part of the carriage was most convenient. With Rocket approaching, there was not time to fetch the movable steps. Edward Littleton MP, a passenger in the Duke's carriage, reached out to Esterházy and hauled him into the carriage to safety.

Joseph Locke, driving Rocket, now saw that there were people on the line ahead. Rocket was an engineering prototype, and had not been equipped with brakes. Locke threw the engine into reverse gear, a process which took ten seconds to engage. As Rocket continued to approach, Huskisson and Holmes panicked. Holmes clung to the side of the Duke's carriage, while Huskisson made two efforts to run across the track to safety, each time returning to the side of the carriage.

Pressed against the side of the carriage, the remaining gap was just enough for Huskisson and Holmes to escape without injury, but Huskisson misjudged the distance. According to Edward Littleton, the Duke of Wellington said to Huskisson "We seem to be going on—you had better step in!" Huskisson tried to clamber into the carriage, but those inside failed to reach him to pull him in. Holmes, still pressed against the carriage, shouted "For God's sake, Mr Huskisson, be firm", but Huskisson grabbed the door of the carriage. With Holmes still pressed against the side of the carriage, the door, with Huskisson hanging on to it, swung out directly into the path of Rocket. Rocket collided with the door and Huskisson fell onto the track in front of the locomotive.

In the words of Harriet Arbuthnot, who was in the Duke's carriage, '[Huskisson] was caught by it, thrown down & the engine passed over his leg & thigh, crushing it in a most frightful way. It is impossible to give an idea of the scene that followed, of the horror of everyone present or of the piercing shrieks of his unfortunate wife, who was in the car. He said scarcely more than, "It's all over with me. Bring me my wife and let me die.

Initial reaction 
 Joseph Parkes, Lord Wilton and William Rathbone were the first to reach Huskisson. They found that a wheel had passed over his right calf and thigh, leaving his knee itself untouched. A flap of skin on his upper leg had been cut back, exposing the muscles, and the exposed arteries had not been severed but were flattened, pulsing with Huskisson's heartbeat. The damaged leg shook uncontrollably. Observers noted that Huskisson did not appear to be in pain, and instead lay watching the leg shake. Huskisson shouted "This is the death of me". Parkes attempted to reassure him, but Huskisson replied "Yes, I am dying, call Mrs Huskisson". A man threw his coat over William Huskisson's leg to spare Emily Huskisson from seeing the extent of his injuries, and she was helped from the carriage in which she had been sitting. In hysterics, she attempted to throw herself onto Huskisson, but was restrained by fellow passengers as Lord Wilton applied a makeshift tourniquet he had made using handkerchiefs and an elderly passenger's walking stick. Other passengers ripped the door of a nearby railway storeroom from its hinges, to serve as a makeshift stretcher. Huskisson was lifted onto the door, shaking his head and saying "Where is Mrs Huskisson? I have met my death, God forgive me." (Garfield, writing in 2002, gives his words as "This is my death, God forgive me".)

Men ran along the track in both directions to tell the other trains not to proceed. In the initial panic, the first thought of many of those present was that the Prime Minister had been assassinated.

Henry Herbert Southey, physician to the recently deceased George IV, had travelled in the Duke's train, as had Dr Hunter, professor of anatomy at the University of Edinburgh. The two of them rushed to Huskisson's side, joined shortly afterwards by Joseph Brandreth, a Liverpool surgeon who had been travelling behind Phoenix. The doctors suggested returning Huskisson to Liverpool for treatment, but George Stephenson insisted that it would be better to take him on to Manchester.

Huskisson was loaded onto the flat-bottomed wagon of the Duke's train which had carried the band. The remaining three carriages of the Duke's train were detached and the band's carriage, hauled by Northumbrian, set off for Manchester with Stephenson driving. Lord Wilton held Huskisson's hands and arms steady, while Lord Colville supported his head on his knees and tried to cushion him from the vibration of the train. With the train almost unladen and Stephenson running the engine flat-out, the train reached the speed of almost , briefly giving those on board the world speed record. The crowds lining the route, unaware of what had happened, cheered and waved as Northumbrian rushed past.

Believing Huskisson to be near death, Brandreth suggested that the party stop at the first house they came to. After some discussion the doctors decided to stop at the vicarage of the Rev. Thomas Blackburne, vicar of Eccles, four miles (6.4 km) short of Manchester. When told of the decision, Huskisson concurred, saying "Pray do so, I am sure my friend Blackburne will be kind to me", unaware that Blackburne had been invited to the inauguration of the railway and was now waiting with the rest of the passengers at Parkside.

Eccles 
By the time the train reached Eccles, the day's drizzle had been replaced by a storm. The doctors carried Huskisson, still on his door, off the train into a torrent of hail and thunder and walked the few hundred yards to the vicarage, frequently losing their footing as they climbed the deep cutting. Meanwhile, Stephenson and Wilton restarted the train and went on to Manchester to fetch medical assistance.

The party arrived at the vicarage to be greeted by Mrs Blackburne. (Mrs Blackburne had originally intended to travel on the inaugural journey with her husband, but the previous day had felt a presentiment that something was wrong at home and her presence was required, and had returned alone by boat. She had then heard a rumour that a mob from Oldham were planning to storm the track at Eccles to attack the Duke of Wellington, and decided to remain in the vicarage.) Huskisson was moved to the sofa, and given laudanum and brandy. At about 2:00 pm Hunter and Brandreth cut Huskisson's clothing away from his damaged leg to give it a proper examination. Unfamiliar with industrial injuries, they were baffled by the nature of the damage to Huskisson's leg, but concluded that despite the apparent severity of his injuries the wounds were treatable.

The doctors decided that Huskisson was likely to survive but his injured leg was likely to need amputation. With no medicines or surgical tools, they waited for the arrival of the surgical equipment and medical specialists Stephenson had gone to summon from Manchester.

A coach from Manchester eventually arrived bearing four surgeons, led by William Robert Whatton. By this time Huskisson was suffering severe spasms, and those present were having to hold his arms and legs down to stop him falling off the sofa. Whatton assessed that Huskisson was suffering from severe haemorrhaging from the initial wound and subsequent blood loss, and that amputation was necessary to prevent a fatal loss of blood. However, in Huskisson's agitated condition Whatton felt that traumatic surgery would likely prove fatal. Whatton and his colleagues applied warm water to Huskisson's chest, feet and hands, and gave him warm cordials and further laudanum in an effort to calm him enough to withstand the shock of surgery. At around 3:00 pm the party heard the sound of cannon fire from the west. Told that the cannons were probably being fired to mark the arrival of the Prime Minister in Manchester, Huskisson said "I hope to God the Duke may get safe through the day". At around 4:00 pm Huskisson had regained enough strength to dictate to William Wainewright, his secretary, a brief amendment to his will ensuring that Emily Huskisson would inherit all his property, and shakily signed it. He then requested the sacrament, which was performed by the Rev Blackburne, and read the Lord's Prayer with Wilton. When Huskisson came to the line "and forgive us our trespasses, as we forgive them that trespass against us", he said "That I do most heartily; and I declare to God that I have not the slightest feeling of ill-will towards any human being."

Continuation to Manchester 
Meanwhile, back at Parkside the other seven trains had come to a halt following the accident. The electrical telegraph had not yet been invented and no signalling system was in place advanced enough to communicate with Northumbrian, with Liverpool and Manchester, or with the party who had accompanied Huskisson to Eccles. The remaining passengers and railway staff congregated near the accident site to discuss how best to proceed. The L&M staff argued that since the railway was not at fault for the accident they should be allowed to continue to Manchester to prove the viability of the design. They also made the point that a large crowd would by now have gathered in Manchester, waiting to see the arrival of the trains and to get a glimpse of the Duke of Wellington. Joseph Sandars also suggested that, did the group not continue, the Manchester crowd would hear rumours of the accident and believe it to be more serious than it was. The Prime Minister and Sir Robert Peel, the Home Secretary, felt that it would be disrespectful to Huskisson to continue, and advocated that the group return to Liverpool to await news of Huskisson's condition.

At about the time Whatton's party of surgeons arrived at Eccles, riders on horseback arrived at Parkside from Manchester and Salford. They reported that the crowd in Manchester was becoming restless, and that the authorities feared a riot if the Duke did not arrive.  The Duke's party returned to Edmondson's elaborate ducal carriage, still on the southern track. Northumbrian had gone ahead with Huskisson and the other seven locomotives were all on the northern track, and there was no way to move what remained of the Duke's train onto the northern track or transfer a locomotive to the southern. A long chain was tied between Phoenix on the northern track, and the three remaining carriages of the Duke's train on the southern track. At 1:30 pm Phoenix and its train were then attached to North Star and its train and the two locomotives set out at low speed towards Manchester, passing Eccles and heading into the deserted marshland of Chat Moss.

Arrival in Manchester 
As Wellington's makeshift train slowly headed towards Manchester, it was accompanied along the route by cheering crowds, still unaware of the accident. As they passed the milepost marking  from Liverpool, in the middle of Chat Moss, they met Stephenson and Northumbrian on the southern track, returning from Manchester. Stephenson told the party of Huskisson's condition when he last saw him before leaving Eccles for Manchester (erroneously claiming that amputation had already been attempted successfully), and boasted of having set a new speed record. The three remaining carriages of Wellington's original train, still on the southern track, were detached from the train and attached to Northumbrian, which set off at full speed for Manchester. As the train approached Manchester the trackside bystanders became increasingly hostile, booing, hissing and waving banners against Wellington. Hostile crowds spilled onto the track, forcing the trains to slow to a crawl. Eventually the crowds on the track became so dense they were unable to disperse as the trains approached, and the trains were obliged "to play the part of the juggernaut car", pushing people out of their path with their own momentum.

The Duke of Wellington arrived at Liverpool Road, the L&M's Manchester terminus, a little before 3:00 pm. As the messengers sent to Parkside had warned, the crowd had become hostile; one observer described them as "A slovenly, ragged set, with hair uncombed and beards unshaven, with waistcoats open, exhibiting unwashed skin, dirty linen, and bare necks." While some present cheered, others—especially weavers—hissed the Duke and pelted his carriage with vegetables. Two tricolore flags were hoisted, and banners reading "No Corn Laws" and "Vote by Ballot" were waved. The passengers on the trains disembarked and headed to a buffet of cold meats in the L&M's warehouse. On disembarking from the train the Rev Thomas Blackburne learned for the first time that Huskisson was in his vicarage, and rushed home to Eccles by horse. Fearing the hostile crowd, Wellington refused to leave his carriage, sent for food to be brought in to him, and ordered that the locomotives be readied for return to Liverpool as soon as possible. At 4:37 pm the trains began to pull out of Manchester to head back to Liverpool.

Return to Liverpool 
The hasty departure from Manchester degenerated into chaos. Mechanical failures and a lack of space to turn the locomotives meant that the seven trains on the northern track were unable to get out of the station. Only three carriages—the Duke's among them—managed to leave successfully. At around 6:30 pm the Duke arrived in Roby, and went to spend the night at the Marquess of Salisbury's house at Childwall Hall. Meanwhile, the remaining 24 passenger carriages were eventually lashed together with rope and fastened to the three locomotives which remained usable, which hauled this single long train, carrying around 600 passengers, out of Manchester at a speed of around 5 mph (8 km/h), further slowed by crowds of people standing on the tracks and by grit and mud settling on the rails.

The eight trains had been scheduled to arrive back in Liverpool at 4:00 pm. By 7:00 pm, the passenger train was not yet even halfway back to Liverpool. As darkness fell it began to rain, and the drivers, fearing for the safety of the trains in the dark and wet, slowed the train further. As it had not been intended that the inaugural journey take place in the darkness the trains were not fitted with lighting or engine lamps; the driver of Comet, leading the train, held a burning tarry rope to light the way ahead. Although some of the crowds lining the route were now dispersing, many others had remained to see the trains return. These crowds had been drinking all day; as the train passed under bridges the train, with its open carriages, was pelted with objects thrown down from the bridges, and on one occasion Comet struck a wheelbarrow, apparently deliberately placed across the rails. Passing Eccles, the train stopped briefly for enquiries to be made about Huskisson; those enquiring were told that he was looking frail, and a successful operation was unlikely in his current condition.

Shortly after passing the accident site at Parkside, the train passed a group of uniformed men walking along the railway carrying a variety of objects. It later transpired that this was the band, who had left their wagon when it had been commandeered to carry the injured Huskisson. The train which had carried the Duke of Wellington to Roby had not had space for them, and had left them to wait for the other trains which they believed were following. The band had eventually given up waiting and walked home, along a grass verge that was turning to mud under the heavy rain. As the train passed Sutton the three engines were unable to haul the combined weight of the train up an incline, and 400 of the men aboard were obliged to get out of the train and walk for a mile, illuminated only by the sparks flying from the locomotives, as the engines slowly hauled the empty carriages up the gradient. The train finally arrived in Liverpool at 10:30 pm. Many of the guests had planned to return home in daylight following the completion of the journey, and set out into the pitch-black city in search of somewhere to sleep.

The group who had watched the departure of the trains from the top of the chimney near the Liverpool tunnel, meanwhile, had been forgotten in the confusion, and were unable to get down from their vantage point. Eventually at around 8:00 pm John Harrison, a teacher of gymnastics and swordsmanship, lowered himself down the rope hand-over-hand, and coaxed the others to follow him down in the same manner. The angry group then set out in search of the worker who had been supposed to bring them down.

James Radley, owner of Liverpool's landmark Adelphi Hotel, had laid on a banquet for 7:00 pm to celebrate "the success and promotion of steam power". He had prepared food for 230, and sold 60 advance tickets. By 9:00 pm, with most of the passengers still on the train back from Manchester including Liverpool trade magnate William Brown who was to chair the meeting, only 20 people had turned up. Businessman and politician John Ashton Yates was drafted in to replace Brown, and the 20 diners began a subdued two-hour meal, frequently interrupted by riders bringing the latest news from Eccles. During the main course messages were brought that an operation had been performed successfully and that Huskisson was recovering; by dessert another messenger brought the message that no operation had been performed after all, and that Huskisson was worsening. By the time the meal concluded at around 11:00 pm, no reliable news of Huskisson's condition had arrived. Following a toast to the King and to Huskisson's recovery, steamship pioneer Francis B. Ogden, at the time the American Consul in Liverpool, gave a speech about the planned Baltimore and Ohio Railroad and of forthcoming schemes to connect New Orleans with the Great Lakes by rail. Although they did not know it, by this time Huskisson was already dead.

Death of William Huskisson 
As the evening progressed Huskisson continued to weaken. The doctors had concluded that without amputation he would continue to deteriorate, but that he had no realistic chance of surviving major surgery, and broke this news to the Huskissons. William Huskisson already believed that he was dying and had resigned himself to his fate; Emily Huskisson at first caused "a dreadful scene ... but at last she calmed herself and during the rest of the time sat weeping by the couch". Huskisson told Brandreth "You see I shall never live to make any return for your kindness. You have done all that is possible, but it is all in vain." After further laudanum, he complained "Why endeavour to support my strength? I must die, it is only prolonging my sufferings."

At about 11:00 pm that night William Wainewright sat down in Blackburne's study at Eccles vicarage to write a brief letter to the Mayor of Liverpool.

At 7:30 am the next morning, the Duke of Wellington wrote to the Mayor of Liverpool from his lodgings in nearby Roby. He had been due to receive the Freedom of the City, but felt that under the circumstances any kind of celebration would be inappropriate, and said that he would not be attending any of the planned events in the city that day. The planned parades and ceremonial dinner were cancelled, but in the absence of rapid transit or mass communication there was no way to notify most of the city's population. While some shops had heard the news and remained shuttered, the ships in Liverpool's docks remained festooned with brightly coloured streamers, and sounded their horns at the time the Duke was expected to be passing.

Inquest 
Given Huskisson's importance, and the potential impact on the future of Liverpool and Manchester's industries and on the embryonic railway industry of any findings of liability on the part of the railway, a swift determination of the causes of the accident was considered essential. By 9:00 am on the morning after the accident, a hastily convened coroner's jury was assembled in the Grapes public house in Eccles. The coroner himself, Mr Milne, arrived at 10:00 am and was in a hurry to proceed as he had another inquest scheduled that afternoon, but proceedings were unable to begin as Lord Wilton, the only sworn witness scheduled to attend the inquest, could not be found. In the meantime, Milne sent the jury to the vicarage to view Huskisson's body.

After his death Huskisson's body had been moved from the sofa on which he had died to an upstairs bedroom. On arrival at the vicarage Emily Huskisson refused to allow the jury to view the body, insisting on being allowed to remain alone with her husband. Eventually she had to be forcibly removed from the room, and the jury went into the bedroom in small groups to view the body. As "they did not think it necessary to look at the injured parts at all", they took only a brief glance at the body, and soon afterwards returned to the Grapes.

Eventually a little after noon Wilton arrived at the inquest, and gave a full account of the incident. Lord Granville (half-brother of the Marquess of Stafford) told the jury that Huskisson had been suffering from numbness in his leg from a previous operation, and that this may have caused his apparent problems with movement. No witnesses recollected seeing any signal flags raised from any of the locomotives involved, including Rocket, although a system of warning flags was supposed to have been in place.

Although some eyewitnesses expressed the view that Joseph Locke, driving Rocket, was at fault, following a few words from the coroner the jury returned a verdict of accidental death. The directors and engineers of the L&M were explicitly absolved of all blame, and no deodand was to be attached to the locomotive or the railway.

After the inquest was over, Emily Huskisson found two speeches in William Huskisson's jacket pocket, which he had been planning to deliver following the inaugural journey. The first was a brief tribute to James Watt, the inventor of the condensing steam engine, and to all that his invention had made possible. The second was a longer speech. It was marked "to be burnt at my death", but as it was one of the last things her husband had written Emily Huskisson felt herself unable to do so.

Huskisson's death was a major incident, and was reported worldwide. (William Huskisson is often reported as the first railway fatality, including in ordinarily reliable sources. This is untrue; at least two people were killed on the Liverpool and Manchester Railway prior to its opening to the public. The earliest recorded fatality caused by a steam locomotive was an unnamed woman, described as "a blind American beggar", fatally injured by a train on the Stockton and Darlington Railway on 5 March 1827. As a high-profile figure killed at a high-profile event, Huskisson was the first railway fatality to be widely reported.) As news of the incident gradually spread across the country, railways and steam power, matters which had previously been of interest only to those involved in industries directly affected by them, became a major topic for discussion in Britain. For the first time, the population as a whole became aware that cheap, rapid travel was possible, and that a journey which had previously been extremely expensive and taken the better part of a day was now affordable and took less than two hours. In the afternoon of 16 September, the day after the inauguration of the line, the Liverpool and Manchester Railway began operating a regular scheduled service. The first train carried 130 passengers (mainly members of the Society of Friends attending a meeting in Manchester), with tickets from Liverpool to Manchester costing 7s (about £ in  terms) apiece. By the end of the first week of operation, 6,104 passengers had travelled on the railway.

Funeral 

Emily Huskisson planned for William Huskisson to be buried near the family home in Eartham in a small service. On 17 September, two days after Huskisson's death, Lord Granville and a delegation of Liverpool clergymen visited Eccles vicarage to present Emily Huskisson with a petition, signed by 264 Liverpool dignitaries, "requesting that his remains may be interred within the precincts of this town, in which his distinguished public worth and private virtue secured for him the respect and esteem of the whole community", and she agreed to his burial in Liverpool instead. She refused to allow any form of parade or pageantry, or a suggested gun salute.

On 18 September Huskisson's body was placed in a coffin which was covered with black silk. Shortly before midnight a team of men prepared to move the coffin to a hearse which had been parked outside since the afternoon, but Emily Huskisson refused to allow them to take the body. Instead, she spent another night in the vicarage with the coffin. The next morning she left in a horse-drawn carriage with the windows covered. The coffin, meanwhile, set off in the hearse for Liverpool. Although the funeral party changed horses only at remote and quiet coaching inns to avoid attention, it gathered followers as it progressed; by the time it reached Liverpool Town Hall late that evening, the hearse was followed by at least 10 carriages and more than 500 mourners on foot.

For William Huskisson's funeral on Friday 24 September, almost every business in Liverpool was closed. Huskisson had been a popular figure in Liverpool, and the authorities expected large numbers of people wishing to attend. In an effort to control numbers it was announced that anyone wishing to join the cortège submit a written request in writing to the Town Hall. This proved impractical, and the authorities put up posters around the town advising that anyone in mourning dress would be allowed to join the procession. Colour-coded tickets were issued to those wishing to attend the burial, with each colour representing a different section of the cemetery, in an effort to control crowd numbers at the burial service; a total of 3,000 tickets were issued.

Although Emily Huskisson had wanted to keep the service small-scale and free from pageantry, William Huskisson had been an instrumental figure in the development of Liverpool and there was a huge amount of sympathy and respect for him. Almost all the city's inhabitants who were in a position to attend the funeral lined the route; it was estimated that 69,000 people, roughly half the city's population, attended. Reports spoke of all available space at every window being packed with onlookers, other than the house in Duke Street in which Huskisson had stayed for the 10 days before the journey, and of people climbing trees and crowding onto roofs for a better view, despite rain and hail.

Huskisson's coffin was placed on a trestle table in the Town Hall, draped with black velvet and covered with feathered plumes. Between 9:00 and 10:00 am a stream of mourners were guided to the coffin by a group of truncheon men. At 10:00 two mutes guided the mourners out of the town hall and mounted horses; the rain and hail had by now eased. The mutes led the procession, followed by the mourners from the town hall and around 1,100 other mourners who had waited outside. These mourners marched six abreast, and were followed by the funeral committee, 28 local clergymen and two more mutes. Behind this group marched Joseph Brandreth and the Rev Blackburne, and behind them came carriages carrying the pall-bearers, a group of local dignitaries who had known and worked with Huskisson, followed by two more mutes. Behind this pair of mutes was a hearse carrying the coffin, followed by Huskisson's colleagues and his surviving brothers Thomas and Samuel. These in turn were followed by around 900 locals in mourning dress who had decided to join the procession, bringing the cortège to around half a mile (0.8 km) in length. The Duke of Wellington, pleading a prior commitment to attend a dinner in Birmingham, did not attend.

The procession left the town hall and slowly went the  via Hope Street to an iron-lined grave in St James Cemetery, accompanied by muffled church bells. Iron rails were erected along the length of the funeral procession to hold back the crowd of around 50,000 people who lined the route. Emily Huskisson, devastated by grief, did not attend the funeral. Despite her objection to gun salutes a 32-pounder cannon was fired to mark the departure of the coffin from the town hall and a 6-pounder was fired to mark the body's arrival at the cemetery, and smaller guns were fired as the procession passed. On arrival at the cemetery a short 15-minute service was held, after which Huskisson's close mourners moved to the graveside and Huskisson was placed in his grave, to the accompaniment of weeping from his brothers. Shortly before 1:00 pm another cannon shot marked the end of the service, and the crowd dispersed; pubs and restaurants throughout Liverpool remained shut for the rest of the day.

Controversy 
Twelve days after the opening of the L&M, Liverpool surgeon Thomas Weatherill wrote to The Lancet questioning the official version of Huskisson's death and calling the behaviour of the doctors who had attended Eccles vicarage "unscientific, inefficient and imbecilic". He had spoken to eyewitnesses, and concluded that Huskisson's weakness and spasms following the accident were caused by blood loss, not internal injury, and that amputation would have stemmed the blood loss and saved Huskisson's life. He went on to claim that those eyewitnesses he had spoken to had seen Huskisson bleeding heavily, but that no effort had been made to stem the bleeding other than Lord Wilton's makeshift tourniquet of handkerchiefs. He argued that those doctors attending should at least have made an attempt at amputation when it became clear that other measures were not working.

Two weeks later William Whatton replied. He disputed Weatherill's claim that the only action taken to staunch the blood flow had been the handkerchief, and pointed out that his first action on arrival at Eccles vicarage had been to seal Huskisson's femoral artery. He stated that he had great experience with similar injuries from his time as an army doctor during the Peninsular War, and that "none of them [military surgeons] would have ventured upon an operation where the chances were so decidedly against its success". He pointed out that the survival rate for amputations among soldiers with similar injuries—considerably healthier than the elderly Huskisson—was no better than 15% when attempted immediately after the injury. Instead, he cited the advice of leading surgeon George James Guthrie that amputation was not generally survivable until the patient's pulse had stabilised and the initial shock settled. Whatton pointed out that Huskisson's pulse did not stabilise and that he was in convulsions for the entire time Whatton attended him.

Weatherill did not accept Whatton's defence. He continued to maintain that the delays in staunching the blood flow were "unforgivable", and that with Huskisson obviously dying there had been nothing to lose by attempting surgery. He also pointed out that if Huskisson had been fit enough to dictate a will, he may well have been fit enough to withstand an operation.

Legacy 
The accidents on its opening day gave the Liverpool and Manchester Railway huge amounts of publicity, and greatly increased public awareness of the potential of rapid transport. The L&M's passenger service proved immediately successful. In October the Duke of Wellington's special train was put into use as a dedicated first-class train, making four journeys each day between Liverpool and Manchester in each direction. On 4 December 1830 goods operations on the L&M began, with Planet hauling 75 tons of freight from Liverpool to Manchester. In the first six months of 1831 the L&M carried 188,726 passengers and 35,800 tons of goods; in the year from the opening in September 1830 to September 1831, almost 500,000 passengers were carried. At George Stephenson's insistence, new locomotives bought by the L&M were fitted with handbrakes from 1831.

The original Crown Street terminus soon proved unable to handle the growing popularity of the railway, and was replaced by Liverpool Lime Street railway station in 1836. With more advanced locomotives no longer needing to stop midway to take on water Parkside station soon closed, and little trace of it remains. The Liverpool and Manchester Railway remains operational as the northern of the two Liverpool to Manchester Lines. The opening of the L&M is now considered the dawn of the age of mechanised transport; in the words of industrialist and former British Rail chairman Peter Parker, "the world is a branch line of the pioneering Liverpool–Manchester run".

Spurred by the L&M's success, within a month of its opening schemes were announced to link Liverpool and Manchester to other major cities, including London, Leeds, Birmingham and Bradford, uniting the key industrial centres of England. The London and Birmingham Railway (also built by George Stephenson), the first railway to link the north and south of England, was completed in 1838. By 1840  of track had been laid in Britain. The Railway Regulation Act 1844 limited passenger fares to one penny ( of a pound sterling) per mile on the entire British railway network, enabling mass population movements, migration to the cities and long-distance commuting, and the social revolution of mass rapid transit began. The expertise of Britain's railway pioneers itself became a major export, and British engineers (including Stephenson) supplied almost all the locomotives and rails for the railways then being built across Europe and North America.

Rocket 
Rocket remained in use with the L&M after the accident, albeit rarely used for anything other than internal engineering duties. The more advanced Planet design was better suited to heavy loads, and Rocket became redundant. In 1834 it was used for experiments with new drive systems, after which it was put in storage. In 1836 it was sold to the Midgeholme Colliery, and used to haul coal until 1844.

Subsequently recognised as the design from which all later locomotives are derived, Rocket eventually came to be considered one of the most important symbols of the Industrial Revolution. It was returned to Robert Stephenson and Company in 1851 with the intention of displaying it at The Great Exhibition, but this did not take place. It was loaned to the Patent Office for display in 1862. Moved to the Science Collection of the South Kensington Museum in 1876 (renamed the Science Museum in 1885), it has remained there ever since other than a brief display at the National Railway Museum.

In 1929 a replica Rocket was commissioned from Robert Stephenson and Company by Henry Ford, using Stephenson's original construction techniques. It was intended as a centrepiece of the Henry Ford Museum, where it remains. Another fully functioning replica was built in the 1970s for the National Railway Museum. In 1999, to mark the 170th anniversary of the Rainhill Trials, the Trials were re-enacted on the Llangollen Railway using this replica and replicas of Novelty and Sans Pareil, the other serious contenders in 1829. Rocket again won.

 the original Rocket is one of the main exhibits of the Science Museum's showpiece Making the Modern World gallery. Although much altered, it retains the original wheels which crushed Huskisson.

Duke of Wellington 
Huskisson's supporters refused an offer to return to the Duke of Wellington's cabinet after his death, and at the beginning of November Wellington announced to Parliament that "the constitution needed no improvement and that he would resist any measure of parliamentary reform as long as he was in office". Fearing serious social unrest, large numbers of Tory MPs rebelled in a vote on governmental expenses. On 15 November 1830, exactly two months after the opening of the Liverpool and Manchester Railway, Wellington lost a vote of no confidence and was replaced as prime minister a week later by Earl Grey. Grey set about reforming Britain's corrupt and antiquated electoral procedure, the issue over which Huskisson had resigned. In 1832 the Representation of the People Act (commonly known as the Reform Act) was finally passed.

Wellington spent the remainder of his life implacably opposed to railways, complaining that they would "encourage the lower classes to travel about". He avoided them for more than a decade, before agreeing in 1843 to accompany Queen Victoria for a trip on the London and South Western Railway (designed by Joseph Locke, driver of Rocket on 15 September 1830). He died of a stroke on 14 September 1852; it is estimated that one and a half million people attended his funeral.

William and Emily Huskisson 

William Huskisson's death made him one of the most famous British politicians of the period. Within a year his first biography was published, as was a volume of his collected speeches. His policies on free trade and minimal government interference were a major influence on Robert Peel and William Ewart Gladstone (who grew up in Liverpool and whose father Sir John Gladstone had been a close colleague of Huskisson) and consequently on the later emergence of the Liberal Party and the doctrine of Gladstonian Liberalism. Forty years after his death Huskisson was still sufficiently well-remembered to be featured in novels, including Middlemarch and the novels of Mrs Henry Wood, with no accompanying explanation. The Australian town of Huskisson, New South Wales, is named for him. Huskisson Dock, named in his honour in 1852, remains in operation as part of the Port of Liverpool. In 1880 Huskisson railway station in Liverpool opened, closing to passengers five years later but remaining operational as a goods depot until 1975. Today he is principally remembered for the manner of his death, and monuments to him stand in Pimlico, Chichester Cathedral, and Liverpool. In 1982, at a time of high racial tension following the Toxteth riots, his memorial in Liverpool was pulled down by a group of local people in the mistaken belief that it commemorated a slave trader; it was re-erected around 20 years later in Duke Street, near where he had stayed for his final nights in Liverpool.

Emily Huskisson returned to Eartham and lived a quiet life, dedicated to keeping alive her husband's memory. She died in 1856. She never returned to Liverpool, and never again travelled by train.

On the ruins of Parkside station stands a white stone memorial, once badly damaged by vandals but since restored. The original inscription from the memorial has been removed for safekeeping, and is now displayed in the National Railway Museum.

Cultural references 
The opening of the L&M and Huskisson's death were dramatised in the 1935 expressionist film The Steel Animal by the director .

Notes

References

Bibliography 

 
 
 
 
 
 
 
 
 
 
 
 
 
 

Early British railway companies
Rail transport in Liverpool
Rail transport in Merseyside
Rail transport in Lancashire
Rail transport in Greater Manchester
Railway accidents and incidents in England
Railway companies established in 1823
Railway lines opened in 1830
British companies established in 1823
Railway companies disestablished in 1845
1830 in England
September 1830 events
Railway accidents and incidents in Merseyside
History of transport in Greater Manchester
1830 disasters in the United Kingdom